Nova Scotia Trunk 3 is an east-west trunk highway in Nova Scotia. The route runs from Halifax to Yarmouth, along the South Shore. Trunk 3's status as an important regional highway link has been superseded by the parallel Highway 103.

Route description
The eastern terminus of Trunk 3 on provincial maps is at the Armdale Roundabout in Halifax. Travelling inbound from the traffic circle along Quinpool Road, Trunk 3 continues to be marked with "3 INBOUND" signs until just before Quinpool Road's intersection with Connaught Avenue. The sign "3 ENDS" marks the signed eastern terminus of the route. Traveling outbound from the traffic circle Trunk 3 formally proceeds west using the name St. Margaret's Bay Road and passes through Timberlea and Upper Tantallon.  

The road follows  the coast of St. Margarets Bay, passing through Hubbards. It crosses the isthmus of the Aspotogan Peninsula to reach Chester.  West of Chester, Trunk 3 follows the shore of Mahone Bay to reach the town of the same name. The highway then turns southeast to the town of Lunenburg, enters the town following Maple Street, Falkland Street and Victoria Road, before continuing westward to the town of Bridgewater.

Leaving Bridgewater to the southwest, Trunk 3 intersects Highway 103 at exit 14.  Trunk 3 is no longer signed in some portions between Bridgewater and Barrington, as Highway 103 assumed some of its former route in the 1970s.  Trunk 3 "re-appears" as the main street and approaches to some towns that Highway 103 has bypassed, including the Liverpool, Lockeport and Shelburne areas.

At Barrington, Trunk 3 departs Highway 103. The highway closely follows the coast of the Barrington Passage and the Gulf of Maine to reach the Pubnico area, then continuing north along the coast to Argyle. The highway turns west through Tusket to reach its western end at Yarmouth where it meets the Highway 101 and Trunk 1.

Communities
Halifax
Beechville
Lakeside
Timberlea
Hubley
Lewis Lake
Upper Tantallon
Head Of St. Margarets Bay
Boutiliers Point
Ingramport
Black Point
Queensland
Hubbards
Simms Settlement
East River
East Chester
Chester
Robinsons Corner
Marriotts Cove
Chester Basin
Gold River

Major intersections

References

003
003
003
003
003
003
Bridgewater, Nova Scotia
Yarmouth, Nova Scotia